Nevio is a masculine given name which is borne by:

 Nevio Devide (born 1966), Italian former tennis player
 Nevio de Zordo (1943–2014), Italian bobsledder
 Nevio Marasović (born 1983), Croatian film director and screenwriter
 Nevio Orlandi (born 1954), Italian football manager
 Nevio Passaro (born 1980), German–Italian singer, songwriter and producer
 Nevio Pizzolitto (born 1976), Canadian soccer player
 Nevio Scala (born 1947), Italian football sporting director, coach and former player
 Nevio Skull (1903–1945), Italian businessman and politician
 Nevenko Valčić (1933–2007), Yugoslav cyclist nicknamed Nevio

Masculine given names